Filip Misolic (born 8 August 2001) is an Austrian tennis player of Croatian descent.

Misolic has a career high ATP singles ranking of World No. 136 achieved on 8 August 2022. He also has a career high doubles ranking of World No. 1082 achieved on 9 May 2022. He is currently the No. 4 Austrian player.

Career

2022: Maiden Challenger title, ATP debut & first final, Top 150 debut
Misolic won the ATP Challenger singles title at the 2022 Zagreb Open. As a result he reached the top 250 climbing 76 positions up in the rankings to No. 225 on 16 May 2022.

Ranked No. 205, he made his ATP debut at the 2022 Generali Open Kitzbühel as a wildcard where he reached the quarterfinals defeating Daniel Dutra da Silva and Pablo Andujar. Next he defeated Dusan Lajovic to reach the first ATP semifinal in his career. He reached his maiden ATP final defeating Yannick Hanfmann in a final set tiebreak. As a result he moved close to 70 positions up the rankings in the top 150 to a new career-high of World No. 137 and became the Austrian player No. 1 on 1 August 2022.

ATP career finals

Singles: 1 (1 runner-up)

Challenger and World Tennis Tour Finals

Singles: 8 (7-1)

References

External links
 
 

2001 births
Living people
Sportspeople from Graz
Austrian male tennis players
Austrian people of Croatian descent
21st-century Austrian people